"Turn On, Tune In, Cop Out" is a song by Norman Cook's acid jazz group, Freak Power, released in October 1993 as the debut single from their first album, Drive-Thru Booty (1994). The song features a smooth jazz sound and the baritone vocals of lead singer Ashley Slater. The single originally charted at number 29 in the United Kingdom. However, two years later, the song was used in the popular Levi's advertisement "Taxi", and it was re-released on 6 March 1995. This time, the single was a success, reaching number three on the UK Singles Chart and becoming the group's only top-20 hit. The song was also a moderate hit in western Europe and New Zealand.

Critical reception
Caroline Sullivan from The Guardian described the song as "a cynical post-modern shopping anthem with a dash of singalong soul." In 1993, James Masterton stated in his weekly UK chart commentary, that the song "has the potential to be a major hit". Upon the 1995 release, a reviewer from Music Week commented, "Levi's ads have a habit of spawning Top 10 hits and Freak Power's groovy number is set to become the latest." 

Andy Beevers wrote in the RM Dance Update, "With his excellent Mighty Dub Cats and Pizzaman projects, Norman Cook has been sending out low-key signals that something is stirring down in Brighton. Now comes the real deal. The best starting point is the Radio Mix which emphasises the wonderfully mellow and husky male vocal. The weird trippy lyrics, which are nowhere as corny as the title would suggest, are set against a great bassline and plenty of funky touches. The whole thing has a very Seventies feel but it is done with a great deal more understanding and intelligence than all the current disco pastiches." Another editor, James Hamilton, described it as "Norman Cook's Gil Scott Heron-ishly crooking jaunty excellent Donny Hathaway 'The Ghetto' based".

Track listings
 CD maxi 1, 12-inch maxi 1
 "Turn On, Tune In, Cop Out" (radio mix) — 4:21
 "Turn On, Tune In, Cop Out" (Pizzaman mix) — 6:51
 "Getting Over the Hump" — 4:12
 "Turn On, Tune In, Cop Out" (Play-Boys fully loaded vocal) — 7:27

 CD maxi 2
 "Turn On, Tune In, Cop Out" (radio mix) — 4:20
 "Turn On, Tune In, Cop Out" (T-empo's club mix) — 7:35
 "Turn On, Tune In, Cop Out" (Playboys reloaded dub) — 6:22
 "Turn On, Tune In, Cop Out" (T-empo's piano dub) — 8:25
 "Turn On, Tune In, Cop Out" (Pizzaman mix) — 6:50

 12-inch maxi 2
 "Turn On, Tune In, Cop Out" (album version)  	 	
 "Turn On, Tune In, Cop Out" (T-Empo's club mix) 		
 "Turn On, Tune In, Cop Out" (Play-Boys reloaded dub) 		
 "Turn On, Tune In, Cop Out" (T-Empo's piano dub)

 7-inch single, CD single, cassette
 "Tune On, Tune In, Cop Out" (radio mix) — 4:19
 "Getting Over the Hump" — 4:12

Personnel
 Writer - Norman Cook
 Backing vocals - Lucy the Fly
 Bass - Jesse Graham
 Bongos - Bongo Pete
 Drums - James Carmichael Jr
 Guitar - Norman Cook
 Organ - Eddie Stevens
 Photography - Tynan the Skyman
 Trombone, vocals - Ashley Slater
 Producer - Norman Cook

Charts and certifications

Weekly charts

Year-end charts

Certifications

References

1993 debut singles
1993 songs
1995 singles
4th & B'way Records singles
Freak Power songs
Songs written by Norman Cook